Fool Around is the debut album by American singer Rachel Sweet. It was first released in the United Kingdom on October 13, 1978 by Stiff Records. The album was released in the United States in July 1979, by Stiff and Columbia Records, with a revised track listing.

Track listing
All tracks are written by Liam Sternberg, except where noted.

UK edition
Side one
 "Just My Style" – 3:15
 "B-A-B-Y" (Isaac Hayes, David Porter) – 3:08
 "Who Does Lisa Like?" – 2:58
 "Wildwood Saloon" – 3:58
 "Stay Awhile" (Mike Hawker, Ivor Raymonde) – 3:03
 "Suspended Animation" – 3:19

Side two
 "It's So Different Here" – 2:48
 "Cuckoo Clock" – 2:46
 "Pin a Medal on Mary" (Will Birch, John Wicks) – 3:08
 "Girl with a Synthesizer" – 2:36
 "Stranger in the House" (Elvis Costello) – 4:06

US edition
Side one
 "B-A-B-Y" (Hayes, Porter) – 3:08
 "I Go to Pieces" (Del Shannon) – 2:43
 "Who Does Lisa Like?" – 2:58
 "Wildwood Saloon" – 3:58
 "Stay Awhile" (Hawker, Raymonde) – 3:03
 "Suspended Animation" – 3:19

Side two
 "Sad Song" (Mark Middler, Peter Mason) – 2:53
 "It's So Different Here" – 2:48
 "Cuckoo Clock" – 2:46
 "Pin a Medal on Mary" (Birch, Wicks) – 3:08
 "Stranger in the House" (Costello) – 4:06

Personnel
Credits are adapted from the album's liner notes.

Musicians

 Rachel Sweet – lead vocals, backing vocals
 Ray Beavis – tenor saxophone
 Charley Charles – drums on "B-A-B-Y", "Stay Awhile", "Pin a Medal on Mary" and "Stranger in the House"
 Simon Climie – finger snapping, hand clapping, percussion
 John "Irish" Earle – baritone saxophone
 Mickey Gallagher – piano on "B-A-B-Y", "Stay Awhile", "Pin a Medal on Mary" and "Stranger in the House"
 Paul Gillieron – soprano saxophone, penny whistle
 Chris Gower – trombone
 Dick Hanson – trumpet
 Lene Lovich – backing vocals on "Just My Style" and "Cuckoo Clock"
 Brinsley Schwarz – rhythm guitar on "B-A-B-Y" and "Stranger in the House"
 Liam Sternberg (credited as "Pietro Nardini") – bass guitar, guitar, keyboards
 Stiff Chorus – vocals on "Girl with a Synthesizer"
 Mark Sugden – drums, percussion
 Leah Sweet – finger snapping, hand clapping, percussion
 Norman Watt-Roy – bass guitar on "B-A-B-Y", "Stay Awhile", "Pin a Medal on Mary" and "Stranger in the House"

Production

 Roger Béchirian – mixing, recording
 Guy Bidmead – mixing, recording
 Barrie Guard – mixing and production on "I Go to Pieces" and "Sad Song"
 David Mackay – production on "I Go to Pieces" and "Sad Song"
 Bob Painter – recording
 Peter Solley – remixing on US edition
 Liam Sternberg – production

Charts

References

External links
 
 

1978 debut albums
Albums produced by David Mackay (producer)
Stiff Records albums
Columbia Records albums